Benedetto Rocci, O. Carm. (died 1661) was a Roman Catholic prelate who served as Bishop of Nusco (1658–1661).

Biography
Benedetto Rocci was ordained a priest in the Order of Our Lady of Mount Carmel on 4 September 1615.
On 6 May 1658, he was appointed during the papacy of Pope Alexander VII as Bishop of Nusco.
On 26 May 1658, he was consecrated bishop by Benedetto Odescalchi, Cardinal-Deacon of Santi Cosma e Damiano. 
He served as Bishop of Nusco until his death in October 1661.

References

External links and additional sources
 (for Chronology of Bishops) 
 (for Chronology of Bishops) 

17th-century Italian Roman Catholic bishops
Bishops appointed by Pope Alexander VII
1661 deaths
Carmelite bishops